St Eunan's Cathedral, or the Cathedral of St Eunan and St Columba as it is also known, is a cathedral in the parish of Conwal and Leck, part of the Diocese of Raphoe. Built between the years of 1890 and 1900, the cathedral is found in Letterkenny, County Donegal in Ireland. There are two cathedrals in the county; an older cathedral of the same name is found in the town of Raphoe, and since the Reformation, has been used by the Church of Ireland.

The cathedral was commissioned by Cardinal O'Donnell - then Bishop of Raphoe - and who, in 1888 aged 32, became the youngest bishop in the world at that time. The cathedral, located on Castle Street opposite Conwal Parish Church in the town, celebrated its centenary in 2001.

Description

The cathedral is named for the Saints Adamnán and Columba; it opened on 16 June 1901 and is built in Victorian neo-Gothic style on a site overlooking the town. It was designed by William Hague, the well known Dublin architect and protégé of Pugin, and following Hague's death by his partner T. F. McNamara. St Eunan's Cathedral has a spire with a height of 240 feet. White sandstone from Mountcharles was used in the construction. It was shipped along the coast and up the Swilly. Townspeople carried bucketloads of the sandstone to the construction site piece by piece. The cathedral is furnished in oak, with a marble pulpit by Pearse Brothers of Dublin. The pulpit depicts statues of the Four Masters and the Four Evangelists.

The stained glass windows that illuminate the sanctuary and the Lady Chapel are by the Mayer firm of Munich. They depict thirteen scenes from the life of Jesus.

The ceilings are the work of Amici of Rome. The Great Arch illustrates the lives of St Eunan (better known as Adomnán or, locally, Adhamhnáin) and St Columba. The sanctuary lamp is made of solid silver and weighs over 1500 ounces. Willie Pearse, who took part in the Easter Rising, created some of the sculptures found within.

There are 12 bells in the Cathedral bell chamber. They carry the names of the saints of Tír Conail - Dallan, Conal and Fiacre, Adomnán, Baithen and Barron, Nelis and Mura, Fionán and Davog, Cartha and Caitríona, Taobhóg, Cróna and Ríanach, Ernan and Asica and Columba. The 12th bell weighs over 2 tons 5 cwts. After the cathedral was opened the organist played "O'Donnell Abu", "St Patrick's Day", "The Last Rose of Summer", "The Wearing of the Green" and "The Bells of Shandon".

In 1985, the cathedral was renovated and remodelled to better conform to the liturgical requirements of the Second Vatican Council. Care was taken to preserve the style and materials of the original altar in the new altar table and chair. The original altar-piece, an Irish carving of Leonardo's The Last Supper, is still present in the cathedral and has been incorporated into the new altar.

The sandstone exterior of the cathedral was cleaned in July 2001. The stone was then repaired and pointed with a special mortar of lime and sand. Krystol Hydrostop was finally applied to the exterior.

During the COVID-19 pandemic, Monsignor Gillespie, with Bishop of Raphoe Alan McGuckian, agreed to celebrate weekday morning Mass for the nation on RTÉ Television.

Mass Times

Sunday Mass Times:; 8.00am, 10.00am, 12.00 noon and 6.30pm.  (Saturday Evening Vigil -7.30pm )

Masses are held Mondays to Fridays at 8.00am, 10.00am & 7.30pm. Saturday mornings at 10.00am. (During June, July, August & September, evening mass is only celebrated at 7.30pm on Fridays, unless otherwise announced in the cathedral newsletter).
 
Masses are held on Holy Days of Obligation at 7.30pm (Vigil on the night before); 8.00am, 10.00am, 5.45pm & 7.30pm, unless otherwise announced in the cathedral newsletter.

Mass in the Polish language - is held in the cathedral on the first & third Sunday of the month at 4.00pm.

Mass said in Irish is held in the cathedral on the first Sunday of the month at 10.00am.

Sacrament of Reconciliation - Confession

Confessions are heard in the cathedral every Saturday from 12.00 noon - 1.00pm & after the 7.30pm Vigil Mass.

Confessions are heard in the cathedral on the Thursday before the First Friday of the Month from 12.00 noon - 1.00pm & at 8.00pm.

Confessions are heard in the cathedral every Monday night from 8.00pm.

Full details of the cathedral schedules, including up-to-date service times throughout the year, and a weekly uploaded cathedral newsletter is available on the cathedral parish website at www.steunanscathedral.ie and on the cathedral Facebook Page at en-gb.facebook.com/St-Eunans-Cathedral-Letterkenny-667024126809546/

Clergy
As of January 2019, St Eunan's Cathedral is served by three full-time priests - The Very Reverend Monsignor Kevin Gillespie (Administrator), The Reverend Philip Kemmy (curate) and The Reverend Damien Nejad (curate). Bishop of Raphoe Most Reverend Alan McGuckian SJ, along with other clergy and retired clergy living in Letterkenny, also help the cathedral parish when required. The Reverend Damien Nejad, of Hiberno-Iranian origin, has a particularly interesting background as he was the first diocesan priest ordained in Ireland to have a Persian family; The Reverend Nejad was born to an Iranian Muslim father and a Catholic mother, originally from Annagry, in, and later grew up in, Glasgow and was baptised at his own request when he was six.

Adoration Chapel
The Blessed Sacrament Chapel of Adoration or the Adoration Chapel (as it is more commonly known) is found on the grounds of the adjacent Loreto Convent. Bishop of Raphoe Séamus Hegarty officially opened it on 4 December 1988. This single-room chapel is a reconstructed building based on the site of an old school set up by the Loreto Sisters. It is not definitively known when the original building was constructed; however, during reconstruction work in 1988, a slate bearing a mason's mark from the year 1850 was discovered. Barry Feely from County Roscommon designed the chapel's granite altar; this is situated in front of a stained glass window which displays the "Virgin of the Sign" icon.

The Adoration Chapel is open from 1 pm on a Sunday afternoon until 8.30 pm Friday evening. The chapel is located in the grounds of the Loreto Convent and College, which is located adjacent to the cathedral.

Devotions are held in the cathedral on the Sundays of May and October at 7.30pm.

Eponyms
The adjacent Cathedral Square and Cathedral Road are named after the building.

Letterkenny itself is often referred to as "The Cathedral Town".

Gallery

See also
 Michael Healy (artist)
 Ethel Rhind

References

External links

 Letterkenny Guide: St. Eunan's Cathedral

Buildings and structures in Letterkenny
Gothic Revival church buildings in the Republic of Ireland
Roman Catholic cathedrals in the Republic of Ireland
Roman Catholic churches in County Donegal
Roman Catholic Diocese of Raphoe
20th-century Roman Catholic church buildings in Ireland
Roman Catholic churches completed in 1900
20th-century churches in the Republic of Ireland